The Rubber City Open Invitational, first played as the Rubber City Open in 1954, was the first PGA Tour golf event to be held at Firestone Country Club in Akron, Ohio, US. The tournament, last played in 1959, was discontinued as Firestone gained national prominence and attracted bigger events beginning with hosting the 1960 PGA Championship, the American Golf Classic in 1961, and in 1962 the World Series of Golf now known as the WGC-Bridgestone Invitational.

The first edition in September 1954 had a $15,000 purse with a winner's share of $2,400, won by Tommy Bolt. The sixth and final champion in August 1959 was Tom Nieporte, who won $2,800 from a $20,000 purse.

At the time, there were only 18 holes at Firestone, today's "South Course." The North Course was the second course, added in 1969.

Winners

References

External links
Firestone Country Club

Former PGA Tour events
Golf in Ohio
Sports competitions in Ohio
Sports in Akron, Ohio
Recurring sporting events established in 1954
Recurring sporting events disestablished in 1959
1954 establishments in Ohio
1959 disestablishments in Ohio